Oy Laivateollisuus Ab (LaTe) was a Finnish shipbuilding company located in Pansio, Turku. The company was founded in 1945 to serve Finnish war reparation industry and focused on wooden ships. The first vessels were a series of schooners, which were followed by other wooden vessels. The last wooden hulls were produced in 1958. The company continued producing wooden gluelam structures in parallel with shipbuilding.

LaTe specialised on research vessels of which main customer was Soviet Union. In 1973 it was taken over by Valmet, which merged it with the adjacent Pansio shipyard in 1983. Between 1983−1986 the company operated under name Valmetin Laivateollisuus Oy, after which the original name was restored.

In 1987 Valmet put together its shipbuilding together with Wärtsilä under new company Wärtsilä Marine. The Laivateollisuus yard was discontinued in 1988 and the gluelam structure production was continued by new owners under name Late-Rakenteet Oy.

The nearby Laivateollisuus neighbourhood, originally built for the yard workers, is protected and listed as one of the Finnish cultural environments of national significance.

Background 
After the Continuation War between Finland and Soviet Union ended to Moscow Armistice in 1944, Finland had to pay large war reparations. The whole sum had to be paid in goods; over one fifth of the value consisted vessels. The oddest vessels included onto the list were 90 wooden 300-tonne schooners. As all shipyards of Finland had moved to steel as construction material already for decades ago, it was challenging to find experts in the field. It turned out that in the whole country there were just three people who had the required know-how for designing of such ships. One of them was Kaarlo Pulli, who had evacuated his business to Rauma after Koivisto, where his premises were located, was ceded to Soviet Union with the rest of the Karelian Isthmus. Another one was Porvoo engineer Gösta Kynzell, who had previous experience from wooden schooners, and the third one was Jarl Lindblom, technical manager of Turku Boat Works. Delegation of War Reparation Industry (Soteva) ordered from Kynzell preliminary sketches which were completeded into firm plans by Lindblom.

Foundation 
As all the significant Finnish shipyards were fully loaded producing steel ships as war reparation, the wooden ships needed new premises. A new company, Oy Laivateollisuus Ab ("Shipbuilding Ltd; LaTe"), was founded in Pansio, Turku on 1 February 1945. The founders were ship operators Finland Steamship Company (FÅA), Ab Finland — Amerika Linjen Oy and Ab Oceanfart Oy. Construction of the premises began in spring 1945 and production started in the following year. Architect Erik Bryggman was assigned to make plans for a neighbourhood for the yard personnel.

In the following month captain Filip Hollming founded F.W. Hollming Oy in Rauma together with Pulli, August Mannonen and Hugo Pöntynen. F.W. Hollming Oy was assigned to produce some of the schooners.

War reparation schooners 
The war reparation programme included three different types of three-mast schooners: 17 were merchant ships with square rigs on the fore masts; the total sail area was 822 m². The other types had 834–840 m² sail area and they featured conventional gaff rigs or Bermuda rigs. Cargo schooners had a hold of 525 m³. The total length of ship was 49.25 metres, width 8.75 metres and hull height was 3.9 metres. The ships were also powered by a 285-hp hot-bulb engine; the first schooners had Swedish June-Munktell, gradually since May 1948 by a Valmet-produced unit called Siuro, and the ships of the series featured British Mirrlees engines. LaTe produced 15 of the training ships the rest 30 being cargo schooners.

Ramping up production 
Unlike Hollming, which relied on traditional shipbuilding methods, LaTe wanted to invest on productivity. Lindblom, who had been appointed as Technical Manager, put effort on rationalisation and serial production. The ships could be built largely indoors inside a 188-metre long hall which featured two production lines. There was enough of capacity for building eight ships at the same time. The hall was 14 metres high and there were three floors. The hulls and all round timber was produced on ground floor. Decks and interior outfitting was produced on the first floor. The second floor included model and lifeboat workshops; also sails were produced there. Each process had dedicated workers. The first schooner was handed over just in the last day of year 1947, but soon after a new vessel was launched every three weeks. The normal production time was 14 to 15 months, but at shortest it went under one year.

Raw material issues 
The sudden increase of wooden ship production caused lack of suitable raw material. Along the schooners, Finland had to deliver also 200 pieces of 1000-tonne composite barges. As a solution, LaTe started testing gluelam structures after Lindblom's initiative. This required a number of tests and negotiations with the Soviet inspectors. The tests proved that gluelam technology enabled making strong structures from relatively thin timber and it prevented cracking. The first applications were masts and ribs, and soon the gluelam structures were approved in all areas in which the yard wanted to apply them. The glue used in the structures was shipped from California.

Zarya 

The last war reparation schooner was non-magnetic research vessel Zarya, which had been included after into the programme. She was equipped with research laboratories and got a nickname Gold Schooner, because she was the most expensive ship of the series. The anchor was made from bronze alloy and its 375-metre long chain was produced from silicon bronze. Also bollards and rudder were made from bronze alloy. The ballast was pure lead. In construction point of view, the most challenging part in the ship were the eight fuel and fresh water tanks, which had complex shapes due to space constraints. Zarya was the last war reparation schooner and she was handed over on 19 September 1952.

Other war reparation projects 
After completing the schooner project, LaTe built nine "transferring trawlers", which were made for compensation of German property which remained in Finland. The trawlers were 23.6 metres long and featured sails and a 200-hp engine.

Last wooden ships 
After all the war reparations were completed, LaTe continued selling vessels to Soviet Union within the framework of Finno-Soviet trading agreement. Until the end of 1957, LaTe built 71 wooden 300-dwt fishing and sealing ships. In 1958 the company handed over to Soviet Union 12 marine research vessels with 720 dwt tonnage. The vessels were specially made for arctic waters.

During 1961−1966 Late built 13 Nuoli-class fast gunboats for the Finnish Navy. The boats had top speed of 40 knots. They were the last LaTe-produced vessels with wooden hull.

The experience gained in gluelam led to flourishing business. LaTe's gluelam beams were produced for construction industry.

Takeover by Valmet 
LaTe's main market segment became research vessels and other special vessels. The neighbouring Valmet-owned Pansio shipyard had a similar portfolio, and in order to strengthen its position, Valmet took over Laivateollisuus in 1973. At the beginning both yards continued operating as independent business units but were put together in 1983 under new name Valmetin Laivateollisuus Oy. The name was changed back to Oy Laivateollisuus Ab in 1986. During the 1970s LaTe started producing prefabricated cabins for ships and prefabricated roof modules for construction industry.

Wärtsilä Marine 
During 1986 Valmet and Wärtsilä agreed merging their shipbuilding businesses under new company Wärtsilä Marine in which Valmet remained owner with 30% share. As a part of restructuring, the Laivateollisuus yard was decided to be closed in 1988. In the same December the gluelam production was sold to a consortium formed by three workers. Gluelam structure producer Late-Rakenteet Oy started operation on 1 January 1989. Oy Laivateollisuus Ab was officially discontinued in 1990.

Laivateollisuus neighbourhood 
In 1945 architect Erik Bryggman planned homes and a streetplan for the yard workers. The area consists of small prefabricated houses for 90 families, arranged according to the area topography. Each flat consisted originally two bedrooms, kitchen, bathroom, wardrobe and a shed. Although some of the houses have been modified after, the area has kept its original appearance. The area was protected in 1995 and later listed as one of the cultural environments of national significance.

Sources

References

External links 

Shipbuilding companies of Finland
Valmet
Manufacturing companies established in 1945
Manufacturing companies disestablished in 1990
Defunct companies of Finland
1990 disestablishments in Finland
Finnish companies established in 1945